The Third Visitor is a 1951 British crime film directed by Maurice Elvey and starring Sonia Dresdel, Guy Middleton and Karel Stepanek. It was based on a play by Gerald Anstruther, and filmed at Merton Park Studios.

Cast
 Sonia Dresdel as  Steffy Millington
 Guy Middleton as  Inspector Mallory
 Hubert Gregg as  Jack Kurton
 Colin Gordon as  Bill Millington
 Karel Stepanek as  Richard Carling
 Eleanor Summerfield as  Vera Kurton
 John Slater as  James Oliver
 Cyril Smith as  Detective Horton
 Michael Martin Harvey as  Hewson

References

External links

1951 films
1951 crime films
1950s English-language films
Films directed by Maurice Elvey
Films set in London
British crime films
British black-and-white films
1950s British films